Kadlabalu/Kadalabalu  is a village in the southern state of Karnataka, India. It is located in the Hagaribommanahalli taluk of Vijayanagara district in Karnataka.

Demographics
 India census, Kadlabalu/Kadalabalu had a population of 7007 with 3625 males and 3382 females.

See also
 Bellary
 Districts of Karnataka

References

External links
 http://Bellary.nic.in/

Villages in Bellary district